Ness or NESS may refer to:

Places

Australia

 Ness, Wapengo, a heritage-listed natural coastal area in New South Wales

United Kingdom

 Ness, Cheshire, England, a village
 Ness, Lewis, the most northerly area on Lewis, Scotland, UK
 Cuspate foreland, known in England as "ness", a coastal landform
 Loch Ness, a freshwater loch in the Scottish Highlands, noted for the Loch Ness Monster
 Ness Botanic Gardens, owned by the University of Liverpool and located on the Wirral Peninsula, England
 Ness Islands, in the River Ness, in Scotland
 Ness Point, most easterly point of the UK, located in Lowestoft, England
 Ness Waterfall, Scotland
 River Ness, a river which links Loch Ness to the North Sea at Inverness, Scotland, UK

United States
 Ness City, Kansas
 Ness County, Kansas
 Ness Township, Minnesota

Elsewhere
 Mount Ness, Palmer Land, Antarctica
 Ness Lake, British Columbia, Canada

People
 Ness (given name)
 Ness (surname)
 Ness, nickname of Alma Moreno (born 1959), Filipina actress and politician
 Ness, a name sometimes used by French rapper Nessbeal (born 1978)

Fictional entities
 Ness (EarthBound), from EarthBound in the Mother video game series
 Ness (Irish mythology), a princess
 NESS, one of two warring factions in the anime series Starship Girl Yamamoto Yohko
Lapras, a Pokémon whose prototype name was Ness

Organizations and enterprises
 Ness Foundation, a medical research charity near Inverness, Scotland
Ness Digital Engineering, an Israel-based provider of IT services
 New England Skeptical Society (NESS)
 National Emergency Stockpile System, a Canadian reserve system
 Nisga'a Elementary Secondary School (NESS), Gitlakdamix, British Columbia, Canada

Ships
 , two Royal Navy ships
 Ness-class combat stores ship, a Royal Navy class of three ships

Other uses
 Ness Award, an annual award of the Royal Geographical Society beginning in 1970
 Near Earth Space Surveillance (NESS), a mission of the Near Earth Object Surveillance Satellite
 NESS Energy Project, an incinerator in Aberdeen, Scotland

See also
 Nes (disambiguation)
 Van Ness (disambiguation)